Di Lello or DiLello may refer to:

 Alessandro Di Lello (born 1977), Italian Paralympic athlete
 Ed Di Lello (born 1952), American composer, choreographer, director, dancer and actor 
 Luigi Di Lello (born 1968), Italian male marathon runner
 Mauro Di Lello (born 1978), professional footballer
 Richard DiLello, author of the 1973 rock history book The Longest Cocktail Party

See also 
 Lello (disambiguation)